The sixth season of Braxton Family Values, an American reality television series, was broadcast on WE tv. It premiered on March 22, 2018, and was primarily filmed in Atlanta, Georgia and Los Angeles, California. Its executive producers are Toni Braxton, Tamar Braxton, Dan Cutforth, Jane Lipsitz, Julio Kollerbohm, Michelle Kongkasuwan, Lauren Gellert, Annabelle McDonald, and Sitarah Pendleton.

Braxton Family Values focuses on the lives of Toni Braxton and her sisters — Tamar, Traci, Towanda, and Trina — and their mother, Evelyn.

Production
On July 19, 2017, Trina Braxton said in a radio interview with ET Cali that they had just started filming the sixth season of Braxton Family Values.

On December 20, 2017, Traci Braxton revealed on Instagram that the sixth season of BFV is "coming real soon".

On December 28, 2017, We TV aired the seventh and last episode of the fifth season of Tamar & Vince and released a teaser clip for the next season of BFV. 

On June 27, 2018, it was reported that BFV would go on an indefinite hiatus after Toni, Towanda, Trina, Tamar, and Evelyn did not show up to film in Atlanta due to being underpaid. On July 19, 2018, WE tv announced that the remainder of the season would begin to air on August 16, 2018.

After a family sit-down with Iyanla Vanzant, all five sisters returned to filming. The final ten episodes of Season 6 began airing in April 2019.

Tamar appeared in 19 episodes out of 26 this season. Reality television stars Natalie Nunn, Phaedra Parks, and Tiffany Pollard made guest appearances on this season. Comedian Luenell, actress Kim Whitley, and rapper Flavor Flav also made guest appearances.

Episodes

References

2018 American television seasons
2019 American television seasons